Fernando Herrera may refer to:

Fernando Herrera (bishop) (died 1518), Italian Roman Catholic bishop
Fernando Herrera (footballer) (born 1985), Mexican footballer
Fernando Herrera (Peruvian politician) (died 2021), Peruvian politician
Fernando Herrera (Mexican politician), Mexican politician